Pierre-Théodore Verhaegen (5 September 1796 – 8 December 1862) was a Belgian lawyer and liberal politician, known as the founder of the Free University of Brussels. He was twice chairman of the Belgian Chamber of Representatives (from 28 June 1848 to 28 September 1852 and from 17 December 1857 to June 1859).

Family history
He was born in Brussels, where he lived his whole life, and part of a Catholic family of lawyers from the region of Haacht. The Verhaegens had an academic background; two of them had been principals of the University of Leuven. Pierre-Théodore Verhaegen, his godfather, had been the last headmaster (rector) of the Old University of Louvain, before it was closed by the French revolutionary troops. The family went on to become part of the Catholic elite of Belgium, and was raised to the nobility, which Pierre-Théodore always refused. They married into families such as Carton de Wiart and Wouters d'Oplinter.

His best-known descendant is possibly his grandson Arthur Verhaegen, architect (especially of Catholic school buildings), Conservative-Catholic member of parliament, and founder of the antisocialist worker association and the Catholic daily Het Volk. Father Philippe Verhaegen was spiritual advisor to King Baudouin I of Belgium for 20 years.
Another descendant is Marie-Pierre, Countess Bernard d'Udekem d'Acoz, cousin by marriage to Queen Mathilde of Belgium.

Life

Pierre-Théodore Verhaegen grew up when Belgium was incorporated into France. The influence of the French revolution was large, certainly in his birth city Brussels, where his father had established himself as a lawyer. He went to school at the Lycée impérial, and afterwards went on to study law at the Ecole de Droit, which had been founded by Napoleon I of France in Brussels. When in 1815, French predominance had been replaced by Dutch, through the union with the Netherlands under king William I of the Netherlands, he became a lawyer himself. His first large case involved three priests accused of disobedience to the regime of William I. His legal practice made him a wealthy man.

An important step in its life was undoubtedly his decision to join freemasonry. In 1823, he was inaugurated in the Brussels Lodge L'Espérance, presided by the Prince of Orange. His relations with the prince led to an appointment as burgomaster of Watermael-Boitsfort, then still a very rural municipality in the Sonian Forest.

He became an Orangist, a partisan of the more or less enlightened regime of William I (which strongly promoted public education). With the Belgian revolution of 1830 he did not want to be involved. As a burgomaster he ensured that it remained calm in Bosvoorde. After the Belgian state was definitively founded, he understood that the Orangism had no future and he chose the side of the Belgian liberals. In 1833, he was Master of the Masonic  lodge Les Amis Philanthropes in Brussels. It was his intention to let Belgian Freemasonry, with its progressive ideas, play a more leading role in Belgian politics. However, this stance lead to opposition within the Grand Orient itself as well as from Masonic organizations abroad.  Verhaegen was Grand Master of the Grand Orient of Belgium from 1854 to 1862.

From this moment on Verhaegen started the development of a real Liberal Party. The first liberal electoral association in Belgium, the Alliance of Brussels, grew out of his lodge Les Amis Philantropes. Verhaegen himself, from 1836 up to 1859, was a liberal member of parliament for Brussels. Twice (1848–1852 and 1857–1859) he was Chairman of the House of Parliament. Doctrinary and anticlerical, the liberals then formed the political left wing of Belgian politics, Verhaegen himself in those days had pronounced progressive ideas. He was real doctrinary liberal. A convinced monarchist, he was opposed to revolutions and no proponent of general voting rights. He was opposed against a general learning duty, because he feared that especially the catholic schools would profit of it. This however does not mean that he was insensitive for the needs of the lower classes. He was opposed to taxes, especially those that affected the poor. As a child of the Enlightenment, he was convinced that the progress of humanity would eventually lead to a general prosperity. As a perfectly bilingual inhabitant of Brussels, Verhaegen, who had frequently pleaded under the Dutch rule in Dutch, considered himself a Fleming. Although he preferred French and found it normal that this was the official language of Belgium, he thought that the Dutch language had to be treated equitably, also in education. He was not an atheist, but he was anticlerical in the strict meaning of the word: someone who is opposed against the influence of the clergy on society. This strong antagonist of the catholic party called himself in public a catholic, even a catholic better than his clerical antagonists. He regularly attended mass, to the despair of his political enemies.

He donated an important amount of money for the construction of a church in Bosvoorde. He was convinced that religion was very important for people (most of the Belgian liberals and freemasons of that time were in some degree religious, even if they had to break with the Catholic Church). But the place of the priest was for him in the church, not in public life and politics. He denounced vehemently the influence of the church on the state and science, which in his opinion had an oppressing and reactionary influence on progress, and even was in his opinion disadvantageous for true religion It was a time in which Pope Pius IX condemned the Belgian constitutional freedoms, also the freedom of opinion expression, as misleadings (Quanta cura issued on 8 December 1864 – against modernism).

Still, Verhaegen remained a religious man, attending mass on Sunday and financing church constructions in Brussels.

Thousands of people attended his funeral service—politicians, professors, students and alumni of the ULB. Twenty years after his death, the lodge Les Amis Philantropes erected a statue of Verhaegen in front of his grave. In 1865, his admirers erected a statue of him, which now stands by the main building of the ULB at avenue Franklin Roosevelt in Brussels.

Foundation of a university

It is within the social and political situation of Belgium in those days, the foundation of the Université Libre de Bruxelles must be seen. Already in 1831, a group of intellectuals pointed to the advantages of a university in the capital. One of them was Auguste Baron, but also the astronomer and statistician Adolphe Quetelet.

The Belgian bishops founded a new Catholic University of Mechelen to regain the influence on higher education they lost under French and Dutch rule. The government was to close the State University of Leuven, which Willem I founded as a replacement for the old University that closed under French rule, and let it reopen as a Catholic University. The anticlericals considered this as a declaration of war. Auguste Baron, who had become a member of the Les Amis Philantropes, could convince Verhaegen for his idea and on 24 June 1834 Verhaegen presented the plan in a speech during a banquet of his Lodge:

If we speak about the light of the century, we let thus everything to do promote it, but also, in the first place, protect it because our enemies are ready to extinguish it. We must rise against fanaticism, we must attack it frontally and with eradicate it to its roots. Compared with the schools they wish to set up, we must place a  pure morally justified education, about which we will keep the control. (...) A free university should form the counterbalance for the so-called catholic university.

The speech caused so much enthusiasm that immediately money was collected for the plan. Already on 20 November of that year the Free University of Brussels (now split into Université Libre de Bruxelles and Vrije Universiteit Brussel) was created in the Gothic room of the town-hall of Brussels. Although he was not the real inventor of a university in Brussels, he was to be its motivating force. He was first an ordinary member of the Council of management, but already rapidly he took as inspector-administrator the control of the university. Certainly the first fifteen years of its existence the Free University of Brussels had it particularly difficult financially. At that time, the state provided no subsidies, even no study grants. Besides the college money and some support of the city of Brussels its income came from grants. Some professors, such as Verhaegen himself, received no income for their teaching. In those years, Verhaegen organized fundraising events to help the university consolidate its position. Above all, he gave the university an ideal, a mission statement, which he summarized in a declaration he wrote. He launched it in 1854, in a speech to king Leopold I of Belgium:

Under these freedoms, which were refused or opposed, there is one, freedom of research, which places the university of Brussels above all other, which is the essence of sciences. Being able to examine what is of great value for mankind and for society, free from each politically and religious authority (...) to reach towards the sources of truth and the good, (...) see here your Majesty, the role of our university, its reason for existence.

Free research was for him "the independence of the human reason" but and he realized already too well that this reason came in collision with religious dogmas:

I say that it is impossible to provide higher education without more or less touching to the dogmas of this or that church.

Celebrations

Verhaegen's founding of the Free University of Brussels is celebrated annually by students of both successor institutions with an event called Saint-Verhaegen/Sint-Verhaegen. The formal celebration consists in faculty honouring Verhaegen by placing flowers at his tomb. Concurrently, thousands of students from both universities have a daylong party and procession through downtown Brussels.

References

Sources 

 Pierre-Théodore Verhaegen
 Pierre-Théodore Verhaegen
 Pierre-Théodore Verhaegen (1796–1862), VUBPRESS, 1996

External links 
 Pierre-Théodore Verhaegen in ODIS - Online Database for Intermediary Structures 
 Archives of family Lammens-Verhaegen in ODIS - Online Database for Intermediary Structures

|-

|-

1796 births
1862 deaths
Politicians from Brussels
Presidents of the Chamber of Representatives (Belgium)
Vrije Universiteit Brussel
Belgian Freemasons
Burials at Brussels Cemetery
Université libre de Bruxelles
Free University of Brussels (1834–1969)
University and college founders